Milena Todorova (born 18 January 1998) is a Bulgarian biathlete. She competed in the 2018 Winter Olympics and at the Beijing Winter Olympics four years later.

World Championships
No medals

References

1998 births
Living people
Bulgarian female biathletes
Biathletes at the 2018 Winter Olympics
Biathletes at the 2022 Winter Olympics
Olympic biathletes of Bulgaria
Biathletes at the 2016 Winter Youth Olympics
People from Troyan
21st-century Bulgarian women